Philipp Lothar Mayring (19 September 1879 – 6 July 1948) was a German screenwriter, actor and film director. He worked on the screenplays for over seventy films, and directed another twelve.

Selected filmography

Screenwriter
 Love's Carnival (1930)
 My Wife, the Impostor (1931)
 The Upset Plan (1932)
 The White Demon (1932)
 Narcotics (1932)
 The Black Hussar (1932)
 Spoiling the Game (1932)
 Things Are Getting Better Already (1932)
 A Mad Idea (1932)
 When Love Sets the Fashion (1932)
 The Oil Sharks (1933)
 Invisible Opponent (1933)
 Today Is the Day (1933)
 Decoy (1934)
 The Girlfriend of a Big Man (1934)
 Hubertus Castle (1934)
 The Higher Command (1935)
 Fresh Wind from Canada (1935)
 Last Stop (1935)
 One Too Many on Board (1935)
 The Girl from the Marsh Croft (1935)
 The Devil in the Bottle (1935)
 Harvest (1936)
 Thank You, Madame (1936)
 Love's Awakening (1936)
 Tango Notturno (1937)
 Patriots (1937)
 Mother Song (1937)
 Andalusian Nights (1938)
The Secret Lie (1938)
 Red Orchids (1938)
 Secret Code LB 17 (1938)
 The Night of Decision (1938)
 The Roundabouts of Handsome Karl (1938)
 Uproar in Damascus (1939)
 Target in the Clouds (1939)
 Escape in the Dark (1939)
 Alarm at Station III (1939)
 Maria Ilona (1939)
 The Three Codonas (1940)
 Sky Hounds (1942)

Director
 The Stolen Face (1930)
 The Battle of Bademunde (1931)

Actor
 Sklaven der Rache (1921)
 Viennese Nights (1930)
 The Dance Goes On (1930)
 Demon of the Sea (1931)
 Alarm at Station III (1939)

Bibliography
 Richards, Jeffrey. Visions of Yesterday. Routledge, 1973.

External links

1879 births
1948 deaths
Film people from Bavaria
German male film actors
Film directors from Würzburg
20th-century German male actors
German male writers
Male screenwriters
Male actors from Bavaria
20th-century screenwriters